is a village consisting of the islands of the Tokara Islands located in the Satsunan Islands of Kagoshima District, Kagoshima Prefecture, Japan. The village office is located in the city of Kagoshima, outside the village.

As of 2013, the village has an estimated population of 688 and a density of 6.79 persons per km2. The total area is 101.35 km2.

Geography
The islands of Toshima Village are the exposed peaks of stratovolcanos rising from the ocean floor, and most are volcanically active.

Surrounding municipalities
Mishima
Amami

Climate
Toshima has a humid subtropical climate (Köppen climate classification Cfa) with hot summers and mild winters. Precipitation is significant throughout the year, and is heavier in summer, especially the months of June and July.

Demographics
Per Japanese census data, the population of Toshima in 2020 is 740 people. Toshima's population has been declining slowly since the census began in 1950, dropping below 1,000 by 1980, and has since stabilized at around 700. In 2015, Toshima's population briefly rebounded to 756, and in 2020, the population has dropped to 740.

History
Some of the islands have been inhabited since at least the Jōmon period. During historic times, mentioned is made of the islands in the Shoku Nihongi and the Heike Monogatari, and local legend states that at least some of the islands were a refuge for the defeated Heike clan following the Genpei War.  During the Edo period, the islands came under the control of the Shimazu clan of Satsuma Domain. 

After the Meiji Restoration, these islands were allotted to Kawanabe District of Satsuma Province, and then transferred to Ōshima District of Ōsumi Province in 1897. In 1908, the islands were grouped together with the Tokara Islands into , of which seven were inhabited.

After World War II, from 2 February 1946 all of the Japanese islands south of 30th latitude, including the Tokara Islands, were placed under United States military administration as part of the Provisional Government of Northern Ryukyu Islands. However, the three northern inhabited islands in the archipelago, known as the : Iōjima, Kuroshima and Takeshima, remained under the control of Japan, and were placed under the administration of the village of Mishima. The remaining Tokara Islands reverted to Japan on 10 February 1952 and are now administered as the village of Toshima. In 1973, the two villages were transferred to Kagoshima District.

References

External links

Toshima official website 

Villages in Kagoshima Prefecture 
Populated coastal places in Japan